
Waña Quta (Aymara waña dry, quta lake, "dry lake", Hispanicized spellings Huanacota, Guañacoba, Guañacota, Huañacota, Huna Khota) is a lake in Bolivia located in the Cochabamba Department, Capinota Province, Santiváñez Municipality, Waña Quta Canton and Santiváñez Canton. It is situated south east of the village Waña Quta and east of the town Santiváñez at a height of about 2,752 metres (9,029 ft).

References 

Lakes of Cochabamba Department